A cigarette filter, also known as a filter tip, is a component of a cigarette, along with cigarette paper, capsules and adhesives. Filters were introduced in the early 1950s.

Filters may be made from plastic cellulose acetate fiber, paper or activated charcoal (either as a cavity filter or embedded into the plastic cellulose acetate fibers). Macroporous phenol-formaldehyde resins and asbestos have also been used. The plastic cellulose acetate filter and paper modify the particulate smoke phase by particle retention (filtration), and finely divided carbon modifies the gaseous phase (adsorption).

Filters are intended to reduce the harm caused by smoking by reducing harmful elements inhaled by smokers. They have been shown to reduce the risk of lung cancer. While laboratory tests show a reduction of "tar" and nicotine smoke, filters are ineffective at removing gases of low molecular weight, such as carbon monoxide. Most of these measured reductions occur only when the cigarette is smoked on a smoking machine; when smoked by a human, the compounds are delivered into the lungs regardless of whether or not a filter is used.

Most factory-made cigarettes are equipped with a filter; those who roll their own can buy them from a tobacconist.

History 
In 1925, Hungarian inventor Boris Aivaz patented the process of making a cigarette filter from crepe paper.

From 1935, Molins Machine Co Ltd  a British company began to develop a machine that made cigarettes incorporating the tipped filter. It was considered a specialty item until 1954, when manufacturers introduced the machine more broadly, following a spate of speculative announcements from doctors and researchers concerning a possible link between lung diseases and smoking. Since filtered cigarettes were considered safer, by the 1960s, they dominated the market. Production of filter cigarettes rose from 0.5 percent in 1950 to 87.7 percent by 1975.

Cigarettes filters were originally made of cork and used to prevent tobacco flakes from getting on the smoker's tongue. Many are still patterned to look like cork.

Manufacture 

Cigarette filters are usually made from plastic cellulose acetate fibre, but sometimes also from paper or activated charcoal (either as a cavity filter or embedded into the cellulose acetate).

Cellulose acetate is made by esterifying bleached cotton or wood pulp with acetic acid. Of the three cellulose hydroxy groups available for esterification, between two and three are esterified by controlling the amount of acid (degree of substitution (DS) 2.35-2.55). The ester is spun into fibers and formed into bundles called filter tow. Flavors (menthol), sweeteners, softeners (triacetin), flame retardants (sodium tungstate), breakable capsules releasing flavors on demand, and additives colouring the tobacco smoke may be added to cigarette filters. The five largest manufactures of filter tow are Celanese and Eastman Chemicals in the United States, Cerdia in Germany, Daicel and Mitsubishi Rayon in Japan.

Starch glues or emulsion-based adhesives are used for gluing cigarette seams. Hot-melt and emulsion-based adhesives are used for filter seams. Emulsion-based adhesives are used for bonding the filters to the cigarettes. The tip paper may be coated with polyvinyl alcohol.

Colour change 

The tobacco industry determined that the illusion of filtration was more important than filtration itself. It added chemicals in the filter so that its colour becomes darker when exposed to smoke (it was invented in 1953 by Claude Teague working for R. J. Reynolds Tobacco Company). The industry wanted filters to be seen as effective, for marketing reasons, despite not making cigarettes any less unhealthy.

Health risks 

In the 1970s epidemiologic evidence relative to tobacco-related cancers and data for coronary heart disease indicated a reduced risk among filter smokers for these diseases. Between 1970 and 1980 some studies showed a 20-50% reduction in risk of lung cancer for long-term smokers of filtered cigarettes as compared to smokers of non-filtered cigarettes (IARC, 1986) but later studies indicated a similar risk for lung cancer in smokers of filtered and non-filtered cigarettes.  The risk reductions depend on different aspects such as the gender or whether a person is athletic, the study location, the age of the person, and when only studies providing both unadjusted and adjusted estimates were considered. Whether or not relative risk estimates are adjusted for cigarette consumption is not crucial to the conclusion of a clear advantage to filter cigarettes and tar reduction.

Various add-on cigarette filters ("Water Pik", "Venturi", "David Ross") are sold as stop-smoking or tar-reduction devices. The idea is that filters reduce tar and nicotine levels, permitting the smoker to be weaned away from cigarettes.

Light cigarettes 

The tobacco industry has reduced tar and nicotine yields in cigarette smoke since the 1960s. This has been achieved in a variety of ways, including use of selected strains of tobacco plant, changes in agricultural and curing procedures, use of reconstituted sheets (reprocessed tobacco leaf waste), incorporation of tobacco stalks, reduction of the amount of tobacco needed to fill a cigarette by expanding it (like puffed wheat) to increase its "filling power", and by the use of filters and high-porosity wrapping papers. However, just as a drinker tends to drink a larger volume of beer than of wine or spirits, many smokers tend to inversely modify their smoking pattern according to the strength of the cigarette being smoked. In contrast to the standardized puffing of the smoking machines on which the tar and nicotine yields are based, when a smoker switches to a low-tar, low nicotine cigarette, they smoke more cigarettes, take more puffs and inhale more deeply. Conversely, when smoking a high-tar, high-nicotine cigarette there is a tendency to smoke and inhale less.

In spite of the changes in cigarette design and manufacturing over the last fifty years, the use of filters and "light" cigarettes neither decreased the nicotine intake per cigarette, nor lowered the incidence of lung cancer (NCI, 2001; IARC 83, 2004; U.S. Surgeon General, 2004). The shift over the years from higher- to lower-yield cigarettes may explain the change in the pathology of lung cancer. That is, the percentage of lung cancers that are adenocarcinomas has increased, while the percentage of squamous cell cancers has decreased. The change in tumor type is believed to reflect the higher nitrosamine delivery of lower-yield cigarettes and the increased depth or volume of inhalation of lower-yield cigarettes to compensate for lower level concentrations of nicotine in the smoke.

Safety 

Cellulose acetate is non-toxic, odorless, tasteless, and weakly flammable plastic. It is resistant to weak acids and is largely stable to mineral and fatty oils as well as petroleum. Smoked (i.e., used/discarded) cigarette butts contain 5–7 mg (~ 0.08-0.11 gr) of nicotine (about 25% of the total cigarette nicotine content). Cellulose acetate is hydrophilic and retains the water-soluble smoke constituents (many of which are irritating, including acids, alkali, aldehydes, and phenols), while letting through the lipophilic aromatic compounds.

Waste

Cigarette butts are the most littered anthropogenic (man-made) waste item in the world. Approximately 5.6 trillion cigarettes are smoked every year worldwide. Of these, it is estimated that 4.5 trillion cigarette butts become litter every year. The plastic cellulose acetate in cigarette butts biodegrade gradually, passing through the stage of microplastics. The breakdown of discarded cigarette butts is highly dependent upon environmental conditions. A 2021 review article cites an experiment where 45-50% of cellulose acetate mass was fully degraded to CO2 after 55 days of controlled composting and another where negligible degradation took place after 12 weeks in pilot-scale compost.

During the act of smoking, plastic cellulose acetate fibers and tipping paper absorb a wide range of chemicals that are present in tobacco smoke. After cigarette butts are discarded, they can leach toxins including nicotine, arsenic, polycyclic aromatic hydrocarbons and heavy metals into the environment. Smoked cigarette butts and cigarette tobacco in butts have been shown to be toxic to water organisms such as the marine topsmelt (Atherinops affinis) and the freshwater fathead minnow (Pimephales promelas).

Atmospheric moisture, gastric acid, light, and enzymes hydrolyze cellulose acetate to acetic acid and cellulose. Cellulose may be further hydrolyzed to cellobiose or glucose in an acidic medium. Humans cannot digest cellulose and excrete the fibers in feces, because, unlike ruminant animals, rabbits, rodents, termites, and some bacteria and fungi, they lack cellulolytic enzymes such as cellulase.

Many governments have sanctioned stiff penalties for littering of cigarette filters; for example Washington State imposes a penalty of $1,025 for littering cigarette filters. Another option is developing better biodegradable filters. Much of this work relies heavily on the research about the secondary mechanism for photodegradation. However, making a product biodegradable means making it vulnerable to humidity and heat, which does not suit filters made for hot and humid smoke. The next option is using cigarette packs with a compartment for discarded cigarette butts, implementing monetary deposits on filters, increasing the availability of cigarette receptacles, and expanding public education. It may even be possible to ban the sale of filtered cigarettes altogether on the basis of their adverse environmental impact.

Recent research has been put into finding ways to use the filter waste in order to develop other products. One research group in South Korea have developed a one-step process that converts the cellulose acetate in discarded cigarette filters into a high-performing material that could be integrated into computers, handheld devices, electrical vehicle and wind turbines to store energy. These materials have demonstrated superior performance as compared to commercially available carbon, graphene and carbon nano tubes. Another group of researchers has proposed adding tablets of food grade acid inside the filters. Once wet enough the tablets will release acid that accelerates degradation to around two weeks instead of using cellulose triacetate and besides of cigarette smoke being quite acidic.

See also 
 Cigarette butt
 Cigarette holder
 List of additives in cigarettes
 Nicotine marketing
 Tobacco smoking

References 

Cigarettes
Air filters